Sanguinet is a provincial electoral district in the Montérégie region of Quebec, Canada which elects members to the National Assembly of Quebec. It consists of the municipalities of  Sainte-Catherine, Saint-Constant, Saint-Mathieu, and Saint-Rémi.

It was created for the 2012 election from parts of various other electoral districts: it took Sainte-Catherine from Châteauguay, Saint-Constant and Saint-Mathieu from La Prairie, and Saint-Rémi from Huntingdon.

Members of the National Assembly

Election results

|}2014 results reference:

|}2012 results reference:

References

External links
Information
 Elections Quebec

Maps
 2011 map (PDF)
2001–2011 changes to Châteauguay  (Flash)
2001–2011 changes to Huntingdon (Flash)
2001–2011 changes to La Prairie (Flash)
 Electoral map of Montérégie region
 Quebec electoral map, 2011 

 

Quebec provincial electoral districts
Saint-Constant, Quebec
2011 establishments in Quebec